Ŭnjŏng-guyŏk, or Ŭnjŏng District is one of the 18 guyŏk that constitute Pyongyang, North Korea.

Administrative divisions
Ŭnjŏng-guyŏk is divided into 4 tong (neighbourhoods):

 Kwahak 1-dong 과학1동
 Kwahak 2-dong 과학2동
 Paesan-dong 배산동
 Kwangmyŏng-dong 광명동

References

Districts of Pyongyang